Sóc Trăng is a city in Vietnam. It is the capital of Sóc Trăng Province. It was upgraded from a town (thị xã) to a city following decree 22/2007/NĐ-CP on 8 February 2007.

Name
The name is believed to be derived from the Khmer language. The Khmer name for this province is Srok Khleang (ស្រុកឃ្លាំង).

Administrative divisions
Sóc Trăng City is divided into 10 administrative divisions numbered 1 to 10.
The city borders Long Phú District in the east and north, Mỹ Tú District in the west and north, Châu Thành District in the west and Mỹ Xuyên District in the south.

Population
Besides the majority Kinh people, there are also ethnic Chinese and a significant Khmer minority in the city.

Culture
50 of the 200 pagodas in Sóc Trăng Province are located in Sóc Trăng City. Some of the most famous ones are the Khmer Chùa Dơi (Bat Pagoda) and Chùa Đất Sét (Clay Pagoda), Chùa Phật nằm ( Som Rong Pagoda )

Transportation
Highway 1 connects the city to Cà Mau in the south, Cần Thơ, Ho Chi Minh City and cities further north. Regular buses run between these cities. The nearest airport is located in Cần Thơ, which is approximately 60 km from the city's center.

Climate

Notable people
Philipp Rösler, former Vice Chancellor of Germany, born in Sóc Trăng.

References

Populated places in Sóc Trăng province
Districts of Sóc Trăng province
Provincial capitals in Vietnam
Cities in Vietnam